Vyacheslav Kaminsky (born 5 July 1988) is a Belarusian professional footballer who plays for Ostrovets.

References

External links 
 
 

1988 births
Living people
People from Barysaw
Sportspeople from Minsk Region
Belarusian footballers
Association football goalkeepers
FC SKVICH Minsk players
FC Molodechno players
FC Smolevichi players
FC Slonim-2017 players
FC Slavia Mozyr players
FC Orsha players
FC Naftan Novopolotsk players
FC Luch Minsk (2012) players
FC Kletsk players
FC Chist players
FC Ostrovets players